The Sabadell Art Museum or MAS is a museum specialised in Catalan painting from the 19th and 20th centuries and is located in Sabadell, the capital of El Vallès Occidental. It is part of the Barcelona Provincial Council Local Museum Network.

The building
The museum is located in the old residence of Pere Turull i Sallent, a well-known industrialist from the textile era of the city and co-founder of the Caixa d'Estalvis de Sabadell savings bank.
The building was constructed between 1812 and 1819 and was purchased by the Sabadell Town Council in 1964. It underwent remodelling between 1993 and 1997.

Collection
Among the Museum's different collections are works from artists connected with the city, such as Marian Burgués, Rafael Durancamps, Josep Espinalt, Joan Figueras, Ramon Quer, Antoni Vila Arrufat, Antoni Estruch, Joan Vila Puig, Joan Vila Cinca and Joan Vilatobà.

See also
 Sabadell History Museum

References

External links

 Museum site
 Local Museum Network site

Barcelona Provincial Council Local Museum Network
Sabadell
Art museums and galleries in Catalonia